Yoeli Childs (born January 13, 1998) is an American professional basketball player for the Hamburg Towers of the German Basketball Bundesliga. He played college basketball for the BYU Cougars.

High school career
Childs played at Bingham High School, a class 6A high school, in South Jordan, Utah. During his sophomore year, the 2013–14 season, he averaged 11.1 points per game and 5.3 rebounds per game as Bingham advanced to the state quarterfinals. During his junior year, the 2014–15 season, he improved his average points per game to 16.4 and his average rebounds per game to 10.7 when Bingham again reached the state quarterfinals. In the 2015–16 season, Childs, now a senior, averaged 18.5 points per game while he maintained an average of 10.7 rebounds per game and Bingham High School won the state championship.

Recruiting
In the 2016 recruiting class, Childs was ranked by ESPN at 53rd in their Top 100, 2nd in the state of Utah, 6th in the region and 13th among Power Forwards. As a consensus four-star recruit, Childs received athletic scholarship offers from Arizona State University, Auburn, Boise State, Brigham Young University, Idaho State University, Utah State University, Vanderbilt and Wyoming, but committed with Brigham Young University in September 12, 2015.

College career

Freshman year
Childs had an immediate impact with the Cougars as a true freshman during the 2016–17 season. He played in 33 of the team's 34 games, starting in 26 of those games. He averaged nearly 26 minutes per game, scoring 9.3 points per game and getting 8.2 rebounds per game. He was selected to the All-West Coast Conference Freshman Team alongside teammate T. J. Haws.

Sophomore year
During the 2017–18 season, in his second year with BYU, Childs' numbers improved dramatically. His points per game increased to 17.8 and his free throw and 3-point percentages increased to .643 and .313, respectively. Childs was selected in January 2018 as a WCC Player of the Week. At the close of the season, he and teammate Elijah Bryant were named to the All-West Coast Conference First Team.

Junior year
Prior to the start of the 2018–19 season, Childs decided to enter his name in the NBA draft pool. While he did not hire an agent, in order to possibly return to BYU for another year, many believed that he would not return to play for BYU for his junior season. After receiving what Childs called "valuable feedback," he did decide to play at BYU for his junior year.  Childs was named to the Karl Malone Power Forward of the Year award preseason watch list and was later named as one of the 10 finalists. During the year, his name was included on the Lute Olson Player of the Year and the Lou Henson Mid-Major Player of the Year awards. In December and again in January, Childs was named a WCC Player of the Week. Childs finished the year first in the WCC in scoring at 21.2 points per game and first in rebounding at 9.7 per game.

Senior year
After the close of his junior year, Childs again decided to enter his name into the NBA draft pool, this time hiring an agent. He unexpectedly decided to return to BYU for his final season saying, "I'm coming back for my senior year. Let’s make some magic happen." For the second straight season, Childs was named to the watch lists for the preseason Karl Malone Power Forward of the Year Award as well as the Lou Henson Mid-Major Player of the Year Award. He was also listed as a preseason candidate for the Naismith Trophy, the Wooden Award and the Julius Erving Award. Due to paperwork errors as part of the NBA draft exploration process, Childs did not participate in the first 9 games of the season. On February 22, 2020, Childs scored 28 points and had 10 rebounds in a 91–78 upset of second-ranked Gonzaga.

On February 29, 2020, Childs scored 38 points and grabbed 14 rebounds in a 81–64 win over Pepperdine. This put him over 2,000 points for his career and made him the first player in school history to score 2,000 points and collect 1,000 rebounds. At the conclusion of the regular season, Childs was named to the First Team All-West Coast Conference.

Professional career
After going undrafted in the 2020 NBA draft, Childs signed an exhibit 10 contract with the Washington Wizards. He was waived on December 18, 2020. He was then added to the roster of the Wizards' NBA G League affiliate, the Capital City Go-Go. He was assigned to the Erie BayHawks as a flex player when the Go-Go declined to play the NBA G League restart in Orlando, Florida. He averaged 8.9 points and 4.8 rebounds in 12 games with Erie.

After joining the Los Angeles Lakers for the 2021 NBA Summer League, Childs signed with MHP Riesen Ludwigsburg of the easyCredit BBL on September 11. In three games, he averaged 7.6 points and 7.6 rebounds per game. Childs parted ways with the team on December 5, after sustaining a knee injury.

Salt Lake City Stars (2022)
On January 13, 2022, Childs was traded from the Capital City Go-Go to the Salt Lake City Stars.

Hamburg Towers (2022–present) 
On June 24, 2022, Childs signed with Hamburg Towers of the German Basketball Bundesliga.

Career statistics

College

|-
| style="text-align:left;"| 2016–17
| style="text-align:left;"| BYU
| 33 || 26 || 25.9 || .550 || .000 || .585 || 8.2 || 1.2 || .6 || 1.4 || 9.3
|-
| style="text-align:left;"| 2017–18
| style="text-align:left;"| BYU
| 35 || 34 || 34.0 || .541 || .313 || .643 || 8.6 || 2.2 || .9 || 1.8 || 17.8
|-
| style="text-align:left;"| 2018–19
| style="text-align:left;"| BYU
| 32 || 32 || 33.3 || .507 || .323 || .708 || 9.7 || 2.1 || 1.0 || 1.0 || 21.2
|-
| style="text-align:left;"| 2019–20
| style="text-align:left;"| BYU
| 19 || 19 || 28.8 || .574 || .489 || .538 || 9.0 || 2.0 || .7 || .9 || 22.2
|- class="sortbottom"
| style="text-align:center;" colspan="2"| Career
| 119 || 111 || 30.7 || .537 || .356 || .636 || 8.8 || 1.9 || .8 || 1.3 || 17.1

Personal life
Childs is the son of Kara Childs and has one brother. He is a member of the Church of Jesus Christ of Latter-day Saints. He was baptized in the church in July 2016 at the age of 18. He was married on August 3, 2018 to the former Megan Boudreaux who was a member of the Utah Valley University volleyball team.

See also
List of NCAA Division I men's basketball players with 2000 points and 1000 rebounds

References

External links
BYU Cougars bio

1998 births
Living people
American men's basketball players
Basketball players from Utah
BYU Cougars men's basketball players
Erie BayHawks (2019–2021) players
Hamburg Towers playersv
Latter Day Saints from Utah
People from South Jordan, Utah
Power forwards (basketball)
Riesen Ludwigsburg players
Salt Lake City Stars players